Portea grandiflora is a plant species in the genus Portea endemic to northeastern Brazil.

The bromeliad is endemic to the Atlantic Forest biome (Mata Atlantica Brasileira) and to Bahia state, located in southeastern Brazil.

Etymology
Grandiflora means 'having large flowers'.

Gallery

References

DPI.inpe.br: "BROMELIACEAE da MATA ATLÂNTICA BRASILEIRA: Lista de ESPÉCIES, DISTRIBUIÇÃO e CONSERVAÇÃO"; Rodriguésia 59, February 2008; ppg 209−258; article−, abstract− species lists−. accessed 30 May 2016.

grandiflora
Endemic flora of Brazil
Flora of Bahia
Flora of the Atlantic Forest